Nancy Clark may refer to:

 Nancy B. Clark (fl. 2008–2017), American philatelist
 Nancy Randall Clark (1938–2015), American schoolteacher and politician from Maine
 Nancy Talbot Clark (1825–1901), American doctor

See also
 Nancy Clarke (disambiguation)